Leith Hall is a country house in Kennethmont, Aberdeenshire, Scotland. It was built in 1650, on the site of the medieval Peill Castle, and was the home of the Leith-Hay family for nearly three centuries. Since 1945 it has been run by the  National Trust of Scotland (NTS). Leith Hall is set in a  estate with scenic gardens.

History
The north wing of the house was constructed in 1650, on the site of the earlier Peill Castle, by James Leith of New Leslie (see Castle Croft). The east wing was added in 1756, and the south wing was built in 1797 by General Alexander Leith Hay. The west wing, containing the entrance front, was added in 1868 to complete the courtyard.

In 1745, Andrew Hay of Rannes hid at Leith Hall after the Battle of Culloden where he fought for Bonnie Prince Charlie, later escaping to France.

During the First World War it became a temporary Red Cross hospital and housed over 500 patients.  In 1945 the house and grounds were presented to the NTS.

The writer Elizabeth Byrd rented 14 rooms with her second husband, Barrie Gaunt in the 1960s. In The Ghosts in My Life and A Strange and Seeing Time, Byrd describes the paranormal occurrences she and her husband experienced while living here.

The gardens and grounds are open to the public all year round. After several years' closure the Hall was  re-opened by the NTS in 2013.

Leith Hall was featured on the paranormal investigation show "Most Haunted" during their third series. The episode aired on Tuesday 28 October 2003 on Living TV.

Description

The house contains fine china, family portraits and tapestries and some interesting clocks. The hall is noted for its gardens, set in stages with each sheltered by a wall or hedge and each with its own special character. The gardens contain flowering trees and shrubs, roses, fruit, vegetables and ornamental grasses. A little stream winds its way through the gravel paths and stone crevices and at the top of the garden, near the 18th century curved stables, is the circular "Moon Gate" leading to the old turnpike road, once the main thoroughfare to Aberdeen. There are also two nature trails, each about one and a half to two miles (3 km) long. The gardens also contain two ponds and a birdwatching site.

See also
James Leith (British Army officer) (1763–1816) 
Andrew Leith Hay (1785–1862)

References

External links

Leith Hall Garden & Estate, National Trust for Scotland
Leith Hay family site

Country houses in Aberdeenshire
Houses completed in 1650
National Trust for Scotland properties
Category A listed buildings in Aberdeenshire
Gardens in Aberdeenshire
Inventory of Gardens and Designed Landscapes
1650 establishments in Scotland